Conchoid can refer to:

 Conchoid (mathematics), an equation of a curve discovered by the mathematician Nicomedes
 Conchoidal fracture, a breakage pattern characteristic to certain glasses and crystals